The main player in oil refining processes such as fluid catalytic cracking (FCC), hydroprocessing, hydrocracking is the catalyst or zeolitic material, that breaks down complex and long-chain hydrocarbons into simple, useful hydrocarbons.

Over longer periods of time, there is significant loss in the activity of the catalyst and it can no longer function properly. The inhibitions in catalytic performance are accounted by different factors such as physical losses, steam, high temperature, time, coke formation and poisoning from metal contaminants in feedstock. This type of deactivated catalyst is referred to as “used or spent” catalyst or equilibrium catalyst or simply “ECAT”. 

In FCC processes, the equilibrium catalyst is a physical mixture of varying proportions of fresh catalyst and regenerated catalyst or aged catalyst, circulating within the FCC column. The equilibrium catalyst withdrawn as catalytically less active is spent catalyst and gets replaced with an equivalent amount of fresh catalyst. Spent FCC catalysts have low flammability and toxicity as compared to spent hydroprocessing catalysts, however are not of benign nature and there is a risk of leaching of its components.

Whereas, in hydroprocessing, the equilibrium catalyst or spent catalyst is entirely replaced with fresh catalyst upon loss in catalyst activity.

Spent catalyst disposal 

The disposal of spent catalyst is gaining importance, particularly because of strict environmental regulations and high prices of fresh catalyst. Landfills and approved dumping sites have been predominantly used to get rid of the spent catalyst. Catalysts containing metals (nickel, vanadium, molybdenum) classified as hazardous are pre-treated before disposal. Sale of spent catalyst to the cement industry or its reuse in construction sites, metal casting industry, in road building offers immediate disposal solutions but with no economic benefits.  Depending upon the quality of the spent catalyst, a specific property/attribute of the ECAT might be desirable in other processes. With some modifications in spent catalyst compositions, it could be reused in less severe processes.

References

Oil refining
Chemical processes